Éragny may refer to:

Places

 Éragny-sur-Epte, a commune in the Oise département
 Éragny, Val-d'Oise, a commune in the Val-d'Oise département

People

 François d'Alesso d'Éragny (1643–1691), French soldier, governor general of the French Antilles